Alfred Haase (29 November 1887 – 14 December 1960) was a German actor.

Haase was born and died in Berlin at age 73.

Selected filmography
 Temperamental Artist (1920)
 A Woman's Revenge (1921)
 Julot der Apache (1921)
 The Devil's Chains (1921)
 The Amazon (1921)
 Die fünf Frankfurter (1922)
 Sins of Yesterday (1922)
 The Beautiful Girl (1923)
 Claire (1924)
 The Good Reputation (1926)
 Impossible Love (1932)
 Miss Madame (1934)
 The Big Chance (1934)
 Verlieb Dich nicht am Bodensee (1935)
 Manege (1937)
 His Best Friend (1937)
 The Muzzle (1938)
 Heimatland (1939)
 We Danced Around the World (1939)
  (1939)
 Commissioner Eyck (1940)

Bibliography
 Jung, Uli & Schatzberg, Walter. Beyond Caligari: The Films of Robert Wiene. Berghahn Books, 1999.

External links

1887 births
1960 deaths
German male film actors
German male stage actors
German male silent film actors
Male actors from Berlin
20th-century German male actors